The Big Leap is an American musical comedy-drama television series created by Liz Heldens, based on the British reality miniseries Big Ballet, which aired on Fox during the 2021–22 television season. In March 2022, the series was canceled after one season.

Premise 
The Big Leap is a drama which revolved around a group of diverse, down-on-their-luck characters attempting to change their lives by participating in a potentially life-ruining reality dance show competition.

Cast

Main
 Scott Foley as Nick Blackburn
 Simone Recasner as Gabby Lewis
 Ser'Darius Blain as Reggie Sadler
 Jon Rudnitsky as Mike Devries
 Raymond Cham Jr. as Justin Reyes
 Mallory Jansen as Monica Suillvan
 Kevin Daniels as Wayne Fontaine
 Anna Grace Barlow as Brittney Lovewell
 Adam Kaplan as Simon Lovewell
 Piper Perabo as Paula Clark
 Teri Polo as Julia Perkins

Recurring
 Tom Lennon as Zach Peterman
 Robert Wisdom as Earl Reyes
 Fabrice Calmels as Claude
 Brett Tucker as Linus
 Rachel A. Kim as Miriam

Episodes

Production

Development 
On January 28, 2020, Fox gave the project a pilot order, the first for the network's 2020–21 television season, with Fox Entertainment and 20th Television set as co-production partners and was written by Liz Heldens. The series ultimately skipped the step to the 2021–22 television season due to the COVID-19 pandemic, with Fox giving a series greenlight on April 28, 2021. Heldens was set as showrunner with Jason Winer announced as director and executive producer of the pilot. On May 17, 2021, during Fox's Upfront presentation, it was confirmed that the series was scheduled to premiere as a fall season entry during the 2021–22 television season.

Casting 
In February 2020, Teri Polo, Matt Lucas, Ser'Darius Blain and Raymond Cham Jr. were cast in main roles for the pilot. In March 2020, Scott Foley was cast in the main role for this pilot including Simone Recasner and Jon Rudnitsky also joined the cast. On July 17, 2020, it was announced that Laura Benanti has been cast in the pilot. However, both Lucas and Benanti later exited the project. In December 2020, Piper Perabo was cast to replace Benanti in the lead role, with Mallory Jansen and Kevin Daniels joining the series in a main role. After the series was picked up in May 2021, Anna Grace Barlow joined the series. In July 2021, Adam Kaplan, Tom Lennon, and Robert Wisdom joined the cast in recurring roles. In October 2021, Brett Tucker joined the cast in a recurring role.

Filming 
Production of the pilot episode commenced on December 2, 2020. On December 18, 2020, production was temporarily suspended due to positive COVID-19 test results, from the crew members. The pilot was filmed in Chicago, Illinois, and at the Rialto Theatre in downtown Joliet.

Release 
The series premiered on Fox on September 20, 2021 and concluded on December 6, 2021. In Canada, the series airs on CTV2. The series premiered on Disney+ via the streaming hub Star as an original series in selected countries. In Latin America, the series premiered as a Star+ original.

On March 4, 2022, multiple media outlets reported that Fox had canceled The Big Leap after a single season; despite critical acclaim, it had been the network's lowest rated series in the 2021–22 season.

Due to unknown reasons, the show was removed from all Disney streaming platforms on October 3, 2022, alongside other original Star shows.

Reception

Critical response 
On Rotten Tomatoes, the series holds an approval rating of 100% with an average rating of 8.50/10, based on 16 critic reviews. The website's critics consensus states, "The Big Leaps joyous celebration of life and love isn't remotely subtle, but with moves like this and charm to spare, why play coy?" On Metacritic, it has a weighted average score of 73 out of 100, based on 11 critics, indicating "generally favorable reviews".

Ratings

Notes

References

External links 

2021 American television series debuts
2021 American television series endings
2020s American musical comedy television series
2020s American comedy-drama television series
American television series based on British television series
Dance television shows
Fox Broadcasting Company original programming
English-language television shows
Television productions postponed due to the COVID-19 pandemic
Television series about television
Television series by 20th Century Fox Television
Television series by Fox Entertainment
Television shows filmed in Illinois
Television shows set in Illinois